Sharon Yeung (born 5 February 1958) is a Taiwanese actress and film producer.

Filmography 
 Amazing Spring (2019)
 Kung Fu Jungle (2014)
 Beach Spike (2011)
 Angel Enforcers (1989)
 The Legend of the Condor Heroes (1983)
 The Heaven Sword and Dragon Saber (1978)

References

External links 
 
 

1958 births
Living people
Hong Kong television actresses
Hong Kong film actresses
TVB actors
20th-century Hong Kong actresses
21st-century Hong Kong actresses
Taiwanese-born Hong Kong artists